Osman Can Özdeveci (born 23 August 1995) is a Turkish track and field athlete competing in shot put. He is a member of Fenerbahçe Athletics. He studies Coaching at Adnan Menderes University in Aydın.

He won the gold medal at the 2017 Islamic Solidarity Games held in Baku, Azerbaijan.

References

External links
 

Living people
1995 births
People from Selçuklu
Turkish male shot putters
Fenerbahçe athletes
Adnan Menderes University alumni
Athletes (track and field) at the 2018 Mediterranean Games
Mediterranean Games competitors for Turkey
Islamic Solidarity Games competitors for Turkey
20th-century Turkish people
21st-century Turkish people